A. sanctaeritae may refer to:
 Amphisbaena sanctaeritae, a worm lizard species in the family Amphisbaenidae
 Asplundia sanctae-ritae, a plant species in the genus Asplundia

See also
 Sanctaeritae (disambiguation)